Dennis J. "Chip" Wilson (born 1955) is a Canadian-American billionaire, businessman and philanthropist, who has founded several retail apparel companies, most notably yoga-inspired athletic apparel company Lululemon Athletica Inc (NASDAQ: LULU). Wilson is widely considered to be the creator of the athleisure trend. In 2016, he organized his personal and business interests into the Vancouver based holding company Hold It All Inc.

Early life
Wilson was born in San Diego, California, 1955. Both of his parents were athletes at college, and his father in later life was a physical education teacher. In 1980, he graduated with a bachelor's degree in economics from the University of Calgary.

Career

In 1979, Wilson founded his first retail apparel company, Westbeach Snowboard Ltd, which sold apparel targeted at the surf, skate, and snowboard markets. He sold Westbeach in 1997 and founded Lululemon Athletica Inc in 1998. As of 2016, his personal and business interests are maintained through Hold It All Inc.

Wilson served as CEO of Lululemon until 2005, when he sold a 48% stake to private equity firms Advent International and Highland Capital Partners. In 2007, an IPO was offered by Lululemon Athletica Inc. on Canadian and US exchanges. In January 2012, Wilson retired from his executive post as chief innovation and branding officer, but remained chairman of the board of directors. In December 2013, he stepped down from his role as non-executive chairman.

In June 2014, Wilson raised concerns that the Lululemon board was not aligned with the core values of product and innovation on which the company was founded, and on which it thrived. Six months after the board's reconstitution, the company's share price rose from a June 2014 low of $36.26 to $65.33, a change in market capitalization of over $4 billion.

In August 2014, Wilson sold 13.85% of his ownership in Lululemon to Advent for approximately $845 million.

In February 2015, Wilson stepped down from Lululemon's board of directors, saying, "I have achieved the goals I set when I came back, and after careful thought, I believe that now is the right time to step away from the board. I leave behind a new and talented management team and new board construct."

In December 2015, in an interview with Bloomberg Business, Wilson said, "Three years ago, when I was chairman and Lululemon was worth twice as much as Under Armour, I personally was thinking of buying Under Armour."

In June 2016, Wilson published an open letter to shareholders of Lululemon stating that it had "lost its way" and given up market share to Nike and Under Armour, after he was denied the opportunity to speak at the company's annual meetings.

In 2016, Wilson created Hold It All, a holding company that includes Wilson Capital, Wilson 5 Foundation, and Low Tide Properties, with a vision to "create possibilities for people to live longer, healthier, more fun lives."

In 2019, Wilson sold millions of shares while the stock rallied, further reducing his stake in the company.

Personal life
Wilson has five sons, two from his first marriage to Nancy. He is married to Shannon Wilson, one of the original designers of Lululemon and co-founder of Kit and Ace, along with his son JJ Wilson. They reside in Vancouver, BC.

Wilson was diagnosed with a subtype of muscular dystrophy called facioscapulohumeral muscular dystrophy at age 32. He has donated 100 million Canadian dollars towards research.

In 2004, Ernst & Young named Wilson its Canadian Entrepreneur of the Year for Innovation and Marketing. , Forbes ranked Wilson the 10th-wealthiest Canadian and 401st in the world, with an estimated net worth  of $2.9 billion.

Awards and honors
In 2012, Wilson was named Distinguished Entrepreneur of the Year by University of Victoria's Gustavson School of Business, with Gustavson stating that "Chip Wilson exemplifies the values of a visionary entrepreneur...We tell our students to do something they are passionate about. Chip is an excellent role model for them — he's built an enormously successful organization doing what he loves.”

In 2014, Wilson and his wife, Shannon Wilson, received honorary doctorates from the Emily Carr University of Art and Design. One year later, they received honorary doctorates from the Kwantlen Polytechnic University.

In 2018, Wilson was inducted into the Business Laureates of British Columbia Hall of Fame.

Wealth and investments 
Wilson is listed on the Forbes World Billionaires List, currently ranked the 574th richest person in the world. He is also credited by Business Insider and Forbes as being the 8th richest person in Canada.

Wilson is a partner with Anta Sports, a sportswear company based in Jinjiang China, with whom he purchased Amer Sports after looking to acquire Amer on his own. Wilson acquired a 20.65% stake in the joint venture that acquired Amer, along with Anta and FountainVest Partners.

While no longer the CEO of Lululemon, Wilson remains the largest individual shareholder in the company, with 10,955,225 shares or 8.75%, as of July 2, 2021.

Philanthropy

In 2007, Wilson and his wife, Shannon Wilson, launched imagine1day, a charity dedicated to improving education conditions in Ethiopia. The organization's goal is for all Ethiopians to have access to quality education free of foreign aid funding by 2030. As of June 2016, imagine1day had 487 partner schools, 35 of them built from the ground up by its team. Also, 1,130 school clubs had been created, with half run by girls. 66,420 books, 180 science kits, and 160 sports sets had been provided to students. Imagine1day estimates that over 252,000 lives are transformed annually through its education and training.

The Chip and Shannon Wilson School of Design at Kwantlen Polytechnic University is a $36 million project. Chip and Shannon Wilson pledged $12 million to the school with the goal of solidifying the future of BC's technical apparel industry. Lululemon, Kwantlen Polytechnic University, and the Province of British Columbia serve as additional financial partners. The school broke ground in fall 2013 and will include new teaching studios, gallery space for student exhibitions, and a "usability lab" where students can design, prototype, and market product concepts. The school was scheduled to open in 2015 and was expected to increase the number of design students by 57%.

Wilson and his wife are sponsors of the annual Child Run. The Child Run is the largest family fun run in Vancouver, with a 5 km for runners and walkers on a route through Queen Elizabeth Park and a 1 km fun run, followed by a carnival celebration. Proceeds support British Columbia's Children's Hospital and its fight against childhood cancer.  In 2014, the run had over 6,000 participants and raised over $1 million.

In 2013, Wilson and his spouse launched Whil.com, a website designed "to convince professionals to meditate a few times a day in increments of just 60 seconds" by making it more accessible.

Frequently involved in the funding, acquisition, and donation of public art, Wilson has donated a number of public artworks he has funded. This includes A-maze-ing Laughter, by Yue Minjun, and the Trans-Am Totem, by Marcus Bowcott.

Wilson has pledged $8.4 million towards the Pender Harbour Ocean Discovery Station (PODS), through his Wilson 5 Foundation, including $7 million towards construction, $1 million towards operating costs, and $400,000 for start-up costs associated with the project. The facility is scheduled for completion in 2022.

Imagine 1 Day is non-profit organization created by Chip and Shannon Wilson, with the goal that "by 2030, all Ethiopian children will have access to quality education free of foreign aid." To date, the organization has partnered in building 510 schools.

Controversies
Chip Wilson has made controversial remarks in relation to women and people of Asian descent.

On the founding of Lululemon, in a 2004 interview with National Post Business magazine, Wilson said "The reason the Japanese liked [my former skateboard brand, ‘Homless’] was because it had an L in it and a Japanese marketing firm wouldn’t come up with a brand name with an L in it. L is not in their vocabulary. It’s a tough pronunciation for them. So I thought, next time I have a company, I’ll make a name with three Ls and see if I can get three times the money. It’s kind of exotic for them. I was playing with Ls and I came up with Lululemon. It’s funny to watch them try to say it."

In 2013, on Bloomberg Television, when asked by a reporter concerning customer's complaints on why there was pilling on the fabric of Lululemon's yoga pants, Wilson replied, "Frankly some women’s bodies just actually don’t work for [wearing Lululemon pants]… it’s really about the rubbing through the thighs, how much pressure is there over a period of time, how much they use it."

In a 2009 blog post on Lululemon's website titled "How Lululemon came into being," Wilson wrote: "Women's lives changed immediately. Men's lives didn't change however and they continued to search for a stay-at-home wife like their mothers. Men did not know how to relate to the new female. Thus came the era of divorces." In the same blog post, Wilson also shared his views on birth control, writing "Females no longer had to 'make' relationships work because with birth control came a sense of financial and life control. A sense of equality was established because women no longer had to relinquish their independence to a male provider."
 
In the book titled Little Black Stretchy Pants, Wilson wrote that he is not necessarily opposed to child labor, as "working young is excellent training for life. In North America, I noticed that there were some kids not made for school, who dropped out with nowhere to go. In Asia, if a kid was not 'school material,' he or she learned a trade and contributed to their family. It was work or starve. I liked the working alternative."

In the media

Chip has often given interviews to media outlets in Canada and abroad. He has also acted as a contributor to online outlets, including Forbes.

Vancouver Sun, CBC, and others covered the creation and opening of The Chip and Shannon Wilson School of Design at KPU, which officially opened January 3, 2018.

Wilson appeared in a CBS interview in 2015 where he apologized for past statements regarding the Lululemon yoga pant scandal, saying, "I'm responsible for what comes out of my mouth. And if that's what was interpreted then I fully apologize. Yeah. I'm sorry."

On November 18, 2013, Wilson was the subject of The Colbert Reports "Alpha Dog of the Week"; Stephen Colbert sarcastically criticized Wilson for his views on the influence of birth control and for having said that some women's bodies "just actually don't work" for his company's pants.

In 2014, it was announced that Wilson would receive an honorary doctorate from Emily Carr University, along with his wife.

In 2020, he spoke to Vikas Shah Mbe at ThoughtEconomics, touching on how he spots and invests in trends, the growth of specific trends and markets, and the future of retail.

In 2021, after a lengthy search for investment, the BC Parks Foundation acquired three at-risk, bio-diverse islands in British Columbia, with a $4 million donation from Wilson and his family. The islands - West Ballenas, Saturnina, and part Lasqueti - will not be developed, as a result.

Influences 
Wilson has often mentioned the influence of Ayn Rand on his businesses and personal philosophy, in particular the novel Atlas Shrugged. This influence was so strong at Lululemon that they once produced shopping bags with the phrase "Who is John Galt?" printed on them.

Lululemon's company culture was based around a collection of ideas, philosophies, and books prized by Wilson, such as: Landmark Forum, the work of Brian Tracy, and The Secret.

Wilson has often discussed his business influences and how he creates the framework for his businesses, including a reliance on face-to-face interactions, the distinction between "athleisure" and technical apparel, and "trusting your gut."

References 

1956 births
Businesspeople from Vancouver
Canadian billionaires
Canadian chairpersons of corporations
Canadian company founders
Canadian retail chief executives
Canadian philanthropists
Living people
Lululemon Athletica
People from North Vancouver
University of Calgary alumni